Botswana (BOT) has competed in the last eight African Games, first appearing in 1991. Athletes from Botswana have won a total of 76 medals, including twenty gold.

Competitors
Botswana has sent competitors to every African Games since 1991. Amongst the competitors are multiple gold medal winners Amantle Montsho, Isaac Makwala and Kabelo Kgosiemang. Montsho was the country's first internationally successful athlete when she was announced World Champion in 400 metres in 2011 after winning two consecutive Games.

Medal tables

Medals by Games

Botswana first competed in the All-Africa Games in 1991, and immediately started an unbroken streak of awards with a bronze medal for boxing. The country achieved its first gold medal, in the men's high jump, in 2003. Below is a table representing all Botswanan medals won at the Games.

See also 
 Botswana at the Olympics
 Botswana at the Paralympics
 Sport in Botswana

References